Lago di Annone (also called Lago di Oggiono) is a lake in the Province of Lecco, Lombardy, Italy. It borders the municipalities of Annone di Brianza, Suello, Civate, Galbiate and Oggiono.

Description 
The two peninsulas of Isella and Annone divide the lake into two parts (basins), connected by a narrow channel just a few meters wide. On the lake of Annone there are the municipalities of Annone di Brianza, Suello, Civate, Galbiate and Oggiono.
The East Basin tributaries are the following streams:
 Cologna;
 Bondì;
 Rossa;
 Laghetto;
 Bomboldo;
 Bosisolo;
 Sabina;
The West Basin tributaries are the following streams:
 Torrente Pescone;
 Torrente Calchirola;
 Fontana Pramaggiore;
 Fontana di Borima
The lake has as only emissary the Rio Torto, which tributes to the Adda.

Annone
Province of Lecco